Victims of the Fury is the seventh studio album by the English guitarist and songwriter Robin Trower, released in 1980. This was the last album to feature the classic Robin Trower, James Dewar and Bill Lordan lineup. It also saw Trower writing again with his former Procol Harum colleague, lyricist Keith Reid nine years after they had last collaborated.

The album was issued on CD in 1989. It was reissued in 1997 as a 2-on-1 CD along with the previous 1978 album Caravan to Midnight. Beatles engineer Geoff Emerick was the album's sound engineer. Victims of the Fury reached #34 on the Billboard 200.

Track listing
All tracks composed by Keith Reid & Robin Trower; except where noted.

Side one
"Jack and Jill" (Robin Trower) – 2:44
"Roads to Freedom" (James Dewar, Trower) – 3:49
"Victims of the Fury" – 3:43
"The Ring" – 3:09
"Only Time" (Trower) – 3:51

Side two
"Into the Flame" – 3:25
"The Shout" – 2:33
"Mad House" (Wally Dewar, Trower) – 2:45
"Ready for the Taking" – 3:00
"Fly Low" – 3:07

Personnel
 Robin Trower – guitar, producer 
 James Dewar – bass, vocals
 Bill Lordan – drums

Technical personnel
 Geoff Emerick – recording engineer, mix engineer, producer
 Jon Walls – assistant engineer

Charts

References

External links 
 Robin Trower - Victims of the Fury (1980) album releases & credits at Discogs
 Robin Trower - Victims of the Fury (1980) album to be listened on Spotify
 Robin Trower - Victims of the Fury (1980) album to be listened on YouTube

1980 albums
Robin Trower albums
Chrysalis Records albums
Albums produced by Geoff Emerick